Amasi (in Ndebele, Zulu and Xhosa), maas (in Afrikaans), or mafi (in Sesotho), is a fermented milk product that is similar to cottage cheese or plain yogurt. It is a popular snack in South Africa and Lesotho.

Preparation 
Amasi is traditionally prepared by storing unpasteurised cow's milk in a calabash container or hide sack to allow it to ferment. ngokwazi kwami, amasi is milked from the cow, and is put in a skin bag or bucket, where it ferments and acquires a sharp acid taste. The fermenting milk develops a watery substance called umlaza; the remainder is amasi. This thick liquid is mostly poured over mealie meal porridge called pap., It is traditionally served in a clay pot and it can also be drunk. Amasi is also produced commercially using Lactococcus lactis, along with subspecies of L. lactis.

In culture

Zulu  
Traditionally, Zulus believe that amasi makes a man strong, healthy, and desired. During "taboos", such as periods during menstruation or when a person has been in contact with death, the affected person must abstain from amasi. Milk is hardly ever drunk fresh, but it is sometimes used to thin amasi which is deemed too thick to be used.

South Africa 
Nelson Mandela mentions how he cautiously left a friends's apartment (his hiding place in a "white" area when he was wanted by the apartheid government) after he overheard two Zulu workers comment that it was strange to see milk on the window sill (left out to ferment) because whites seldom drank amasi.

Amasi is also popular in South African Indian cuisine where it is used similarly to curd.

Xhosa 
In the Xhosa culture, a bride is served amasi and a piece of meat, which is called uTsiki, as a sign of being welcomed into her new family.

See also
 Mursik

References

External links

Princess Magogo talks about amasi (sour milk)
Study on nutritional benefits of amasi
Review of the destruction of E. coli in amasi.

South African cuisine
Fermented drinks
Milk-based drinks
Fermented dairy products